Jeremy Clayton Guscott (born 7 July 1965) is a British former rugby union outside centre who played for Bath, England and the British and Irish Lions. He also appeared for England on the wing.

Guscott was born in Bath, Somerset, one of the two sons of hospital porter Henry Guscott and his wife Sue, and was educated at Ralph Allen School. He played for his home city throughout his career, most of which was during the amateur era. Guscott was originally a bricklayer, briefly drove buses for Badgerline in Bath, then worked for British Gas in a public-relations role before the game turned professional. During the English off season of 1987, Guscott travelled to Australia and played for Wollongong Waratahs RFC in the Illawarra District Rugby Union competition. Later in his career he also secured work as a fashion model. On 17 November 2016, Guscott was inducted to the World Rugby Hall of Fame during the opening ceremonies for the Hall's first physical location in Rugby, Warwickshire.

Known for his smooth running style, Guscott was often considered one of the finest ball-players of any rugby age. Former England Coach Clive Woodward called Guscott the "Prince of Centres", and rugby-writer Stephen Jones hails Guscott as part of his 'dream centre combination', along with former New Zealand All Black Frank Bunce.

Rugby career

Marking his England debut with a hat-trick of tries in the 58–3 win over Romania in Bucharest in May 1989, Guscott received a call-up for the in-progress British and Irish Lions tour of Australia, making a series-winning contribution in the second and third Tests. He travelled to New Zealand in 1993 with the Lions, playing in all three Tests; though in this particular tour the Lions lost 2 matches to 1.

When Will Carling stepped down as England captain in 1996, Phil de Glanville was appointed his successor. As de Glanville was thereby guaranteed a place in the team, Carling was moved from inside centre to outside centre and Guscott was relegated to the bench. Such was Guscott's talent and form at the time that even Carling noted in his autobiography that it was an extraordinary decision for then England Coach, Jack Rowell, to make. In the 1996 Five Nations, Guscott famously came off the bench to play on the wing against each of Ireland and Wales; in each instance sparking the squad's confidence and playing direct roles in their triumphs.

Guscott toured with the 1997 British and Irish Lions tour to South Africa, where he scored the winning drop goal during the decisive second test, after outstanding penalty kicking by Wales' Neil Jenkins kept the Lions in the game. He started the third and final test in this series but broke his arm and could not finish the game.

His last game in England colours was against Tonga in a 1999 Rugby World Cup pool match at Twickenham Stadium, scoring a length-of-field try and receiving a standing ovation upon the game's conclusion. An increasingly debilitating thigh injury forced Guscott to call time on his career and take an early exit from 1999 World Cup competition. England would go on to lose to South Africa, without him, in the Quarter Final. In all, Guscott represented England in three World Cups – 1991, 1995, and 1999 – helping England to a Final appearance in 1991. He missed most of the 1994 International season through injury, and his form wavered for some time after returning, in particular during the 1995 World Cup, where many believed de Glanville merited a place in the starting line-up over Guscott.

At club level Guscott played for Bath from 1984 to 2000, scoring 710 points in 266 appearances. He also started for Bath in the victorious 1998 Heineken Cup Final as they defeated Brive.

Guscott works for the BBC as a pundit on their Rugby Special, Scrum V and 6 Nations programmes.

Personal life
Guscott was born to a Jamaican father and an English mother.

Guscott is married to Saz, who is a psychologist. He has 3 daughters, Imogen, Holly and Saskia, from his previous marriage.

See also
 List of top English points scorers and try scorers

Bibliography
 At the centre – autobiography

References

External links
 
 Rugby heroes

1965 births
Living people
Barbarian F.C. players
Bath Rugby players
Black British sportsmen
British & Irish Lions rugby union players from England
England international rugby union players
English rugby union players
English people of Jamaican descent
Rugby union centres
Rugby union players from Bath, Somerset
World Rugby Hall of Fame inductees
Gladiators (1992 British TV series)